Mysore City Corporation (MCC) is the administrative body responsible for civic amenities and infrastructural assets of Mysore city (officially Mysuru) in Karnataka, India. The city's boundaries have expanded more than twice between 2010 and 2020.

History 

The MCC was created on 8 July 1862.

MCC was established as a municipality in 1888.

In 1977, MCC was converted into a corporation.

In July 2012, MCC celebrated 150 years of existence in Amba Vilas Palace, Mysore Palace.

Organization 

MCC is the third level of government below the national and state governments. MCC is run by the city council, which consists of elected representatives called "corporators", one from each of the wards of the city.  Elections to the council are held every five years, results being decided by popular vote. Candidates for election to the council represent one or more of the state's political parties. A mayor is elected for a one-year term. Corporators hold their office for five years.

Roles

MCC's duties include; the orderly development of the city, zoning, building regulations, health, hygiene, licensing, trade and education, and quality of life issues. It also oversees engineering works, and is responsible for health, sanitation, water supply, administration and taxation. The corporation is headed by a mayor, who is assisted by commissioners and councillors. Among 63 cities covered under the Jawaharlal Nehru National Urban Renewal Mission, Mysore City Corporation was adjudged the second-best city municipal corporation and was given the Nagara Ratna award in 2011.

In partnership with Susthira, a non-governmental organization, MCC was due in 2020 to set up a plant to recycle construction waste and reserve  of land near Koppaluru village on H D Kote Road for the project.

Response to the COVID-19 pandemic
The mayor and deputy mayor flagged off a mobile, doorstep greengrocer service that goes around the city throughout the day. The technicalities that earlier prohibited farmers from selling vegetables to the district Horticulture Producers Marketing and Processing Ltd (HOPCOMS)  were resolved and MCC expanded the service to all 65 wards.

In a bid to prevent a rush at the vegetable market at MG Road, MCC moved it to Dasara Exhibition Grounds. To prevent the further spreading of SARS-Cov2, MCC decentralized the vegetable market to seven locations in the city and appointed officials to administer them.

COVID-19 brought more challenges in waste disposal and MCC took action to collect and dispose of waste. Waste collected from houses under quarantine was considered biomedical waste and the Corporation deployed nine vehicles to collect it. Waste was taken to the Common Bio-Medical Waste Processing Unit. Personal Protective Equipment (PPE) kits were provided to cleaning workers and vehicle drivers. Vehicles that were transporting waste were sprayed with hypochlorite solution and cleaned daily. The waste collected from quarantined houses was buried in a deep pit as per the instructions from the Ministry of Housing and Urban Affairs.

MCC, under Pradhan Mantri Street Vendor's AtmaNirbhar Nidhi (PM SVANidhi Scheme), organized a "Small Loan Mela", a special micro-credit facility for street vendors. Participants in the Small Loan Mela compulsorily carry their mobile number-linked Aadhaar card and bank passbook. Of the total 11 corporations in the State, MCC was in the first place in receiving applications and disbursing loans to eligible vendors. The schemes included a seven-percent subsidy in interest and a micro-credit facility without security. The vendors receive a cashback of  annually in case they do business using digital applications. They are entitled to more loan facilities in case of prompt repayment.

Urban development
Urban growth and expansion are managed by the Mysore Urban Development Authority (MUDA), which is headed by a commissioner. Its activities include developing new layouts and roads, town planning, and land acquisition. One of the major projects undertaken by MUDA is the creation of an Outer Ring Road to ease traffic congestion. Residents of Mysore have criticized MUDA for its inability to prevent land mafias and ensure lawful distribution of housing land among city residents. The Chamundeshwari Electricity Supply Corporation is responsible for the city's electricity supply to the city.

A section of the MCC-owned Heritage Lansdowne Building, which was constructed on November 19, 1892, collapsed due to heavy rain in August 2012, killing four people. The vendors who had occupied the building were accommodated by MCC on the front side of the structure as a temporary arrangement.

A portion of the century-old Devaraja market in the city centre collapsed due to a lack of maintenance. A Soil Bearing Capacity (SBC) test was conducted; the report suggested strengthening the loose soil spot and constructing a drain to remove underground water, which required more time because of the varieties of soil and the large volume of water beneath the building. Upon consent, the Corporation planned to test soil in other places. Members of the Heritage Committee gave permission to rebuild the market. A detailed report, including SBC report and a revised estimate, will be submitted to the State Government. In December 2020, Karnataka High Court stayed the demolition of Heritage buildings

MCC expanded its jurisdiction to include several villages on the city's outskirts such as Alanahalli, Srirampura, Chamundi Hill, Hootagalli and Hinkal due to presence of many industrial and commercial establishments in the erstwhile villages. Seventy-seven revenue layouts are planned to be included to MCC under the Akrama Sakrama Scheme, which will also increase the corporation's revenue.

Several areas outside the Outer Ring Road in Mysore have witnessed growth in the 2020s. There is a long-pending proposal to expand the jurisdiction of MCC to include eight-gram panchayats on the outskirts of Mysore in the expanded civic body into a "Bruhat Mysuru Mahanagara Palike" or "Greater Mysore’ in line with Bruhat Bengaluru Mahanagara Palike.

The localities of Vijayanagar Third Stage, Fourth Stage (First Phase), Garudachar Layout, Cauvery Layout, Wild Grass, Chennegowda Layout, Subramanyanagar and some of the areas adjoining the Ring Road, which was handed over to the MCC maintenance, but Khata was not yet issued. Both localities are now planned to be included in the newly formed Hootagalli City Municipal Council (HCMC).

As a result of urbanization, the area of water bodies in Mysore declined from 2 (2.53%) to  (1.86%) from 2000 to 2016. Mysore, which was popular as a Pensioners’ Paradise, is evolving into another metropolitan city.

Smart city initiative
MCC is proposing Mysore to be considered for a smart city project, which Davanagere, Belagavi, Tumakuru, Hubballi-Dharwad, Shivamogga, Mangalore, and Bengaluru are already a part of. Under the scheme, the selected cities will receive  each from the central government and a matching grant from the state for several initiatives. MCC had provided all of the details of its smart city mission parameters needed for inclusion in the scheme, including its mobilization of resources, internal resources gathering, service capabilities management, number of individual toilets per household, public participation in the development of the city, audited account details, use of government funds and self-financing capacity.

Cleanliness, drinking water and sanitation
Drinking water for Mysore is sourced from the Kaveri and Kabini rivers. The city got its first piped water supply when the Belagola project was commissioned in 1896. , Mysore gets  of water per day. Mysore sometimes faces water crises, mainly from March to June, and in years of low rainfall. The city has had an underground drainage system since 1904. The city's sewerage drains into the Kesare, Malalavadi, Dalavai and Belavatha valleys. In an exercise carried out by the Urban Development Ministry under the national urban sanitation policy, Mysore was rated the second-cleanest city in India in 2010 and the cleanest in Karnataka.

Under the 14th Finance Scheme, MCC installed e-toilets that cost a  coin to use around the city. These were prominently established near busy places, including the Central Business District (CBD). At many places, thieves have stolen pipes, taps and other accessories from these e-toilets due to absence of security. To publicize the Swach Bharat ("A Cleanliness awareness drive"), MCC chose former cricketer and match referee Javagal Srinath.

Mysore was judged the cleanest city of India in 2015 and 2016 by Swachh Bharat Mission, and emerged as second-cleanest in 2010. Mysore was declared the cleanest among medium-sized cities in 2018 and 2020, and was second in the same category in 2019.

Politics
Mysore city is divided into 65 wards and the council members, also known as corporators, are elected by residents of Mysore every five years. The council members, in turn, elect the mayor. Residents of Mysore elect four representatives to the Legislative assembly of Karnataka through the constituencies of Chamaraja, Krishnaraja, Narasimharaja and Chamundeshwari. Mysore city, being part of the larger Mysore Lok Sabha constituency, also elects one member to the Lok Sabha, the lower house of the Parliament of India. Politics in the city is dominated by three political parties; the Indian National Congress (INC), the Bharatiya Janata Party (BJP) and the Janata Dal (Secular) (JDS).

Revenue sources 

The following are the Income sources for the corporation from the Central and State Government.

Revenue from taxes 
Following is the Tax related revenue for the corporation.

 Property tax.
 Profession tax.
 Entertainment tax.
 Grants from Central and State Government like Goods and Services Tax.
 Advertisement tax.

Revenue from non-tax sources 

Following is the Non Tax related revenue for the corporation.

 Water usage charges.
 Fees from Documentation services.
 Rent received from municipal property.
 Funds from municipal bonds.

Revenue from taxes 
Following is the Tax related revenue for the corporation.

 Property tax.
 Profession tax.
 Entertainment tax.
 Grants from Central and State Government like Goods and Services Tax.
 Advertisement tax.

Revenue from non-tax sources 

Following is the Non Tax related revenue for the corporation.

 Water usage charges.
 Fees from Documentation services.
 Rent received from municipal property.
 Funds from municipal bonds.

List of mayors and deputy mayors

List of Commissioners

List of corporators

See also 
 Karnataka
 Mysore
 Municipal corporation

References

External links 
Mysore district portal

Municipal corporations in Karnataka
1862 establishments in India
Government of Mysore